Salbiah binti Mohamed is a Malaysian politician has served as Member of the Perak State Executive Council (EXCO) in the Barisan Nasional (BN) state administration under Menteri Besar Saarani Mohamad since November 2022 and Member of the Perak State Legislative Assembly (MLA) for Temengor since May 2013. She is a member of the United Malays National Organisation (UMNO), a component party of the BN coalition. She served as Women Chief of UMNO of Gerik, Women Chief of UMNO of Perak and Women Committee Member of UMNO.

Politics 
In 2004, she was appointed as the Women's Chief of UMNO Gerik branch. In 2013, she was appointed as the Women's Chief of UMNO Perak and also Committee Member of UMNO Women's Wing. She was the Communication Supervisor of KEMAS Pengkalan Hulu and Chairman of Public Library Institution of Perak from 2014 to 2019.

Family 
She is the fifth child out of the 11 of her parents and she is now the mother of 4 children and is married to Mohd Faizal Malek.

Notes

Election results

References 

Living people
1978 births
People from Perak
Malaysian people of Malay descent
Malaysian Muslims
United Malays National Organisation politicians
Women MLAs in Perak
21st-century Malaysian politicians
Members of the Perak State Legislative Assembly
21st-century Malaysian women politicians